Muzio Soriano (1629–1679) was a Roman Catholic prelate who served as Archbishop of Santa Severina (1674–1679).

Biography
Muzio Soriano was born on 11 Oct 1629 in Cotrone, Italy and ordained a priest on 22 May 1655.
On 19 Feb 1674, he was appointed during the papacy of Pope Clement X as Archbishop of Santa Severina.
On 4 Mar 1674, he was consecrated bishop by Francesco Nerli (iuniore), Archbishop of Florence, with Francesco Boccapaduli, Bishop Emeritus of Città di Castello, and Giuseppe Eusanio, Titular Bishop of Porphyreon, serving as co-consecrators. 
He served as Archbishop of Santa Severina until his death on 26 Aug 1679.

References

External links and additional sources
 (for Chronology of Bishops) 
 (for Chronology of Bishops)  

17th-century Italian Roman Catholic archbishops
Bishops appointed by Pope Clement X
1629 births
1679 deaths